Zare is a 1926 Soviet Armenian drama film, directed by Hamo Beknazarian. Zare is the first Armenian film dedicated to Kurdish culture and was inspired by the text "Zare" written by Hakob Ghazaryan.

Cast 
Maria Tenazi as Zare
Hrachia Nersisyan as Saydo
Avet Avetisyan as Slo
Olga Gulazyan as Lyatif Khanum
Manvel Manvelyan as Msto
Nina Manucharyan as Nano
Hambartsum Khachanyan as Khdo
M. Garagash as Temur-Bek 
Aram Amirbekyan as Clerk
Sh. Guramashvili as Police-officer
Amasi Martirosyan as Zurba
M. Aghamalov as Sheikh
N. Barres as Head of Uezd
N. Aghambekyan as Zare's girlfriend
S. Gevorgyan as  Zurba's wife

References

External links
 
 Zare shop

1926 drama films
1926 films
Soviet black-and-white films
Soviet drama films
Soviet silent feature films
Armenfilm films
Films directed by Hamo Beknazarian
Films set in Armenia
Soviet-era Armenian films
Kurdish culture
Armenian black-and-white films
Armenian silent feature films
Armenian drama films
Silent drama films